The Justice Guild of America is a superhero team featured in the Justice League animated series two-part episode "Legends", an homage to the Golden Age Justice Society of America, and to a degree the Silver Age Justice League of America.

Synopsis
At the climax of a fight between the Justice League and a giant robot remote-controlled by Lex Luthor, it falls over, threatening to crush Flash, Green Lantern, Hawkgirl, and J'onn J'onzz. The Flash tries to stop the damaged robot falling onto the other Leaguers by running so fast that he creates a tornado-like vortex just as the robot's energy core explodes. This causes the four heroes to accidentally be sent to Seaboard City, an idyllic 1950s locale in a parallel Earth.

There, they meet the Justice Guild of America members Tom Turbine, The Streak, the Green Guardsman (not to be confused with Green Guardsman of Amalgam Comics), Black Siren, Catman, and their sidekick/mascot Ray Thompson. They first fight when Green Lantern and Flash stop a robbery by Justice Guild enemy Music Master and the Guild mistakes them for the thieves. After the Streak sees Flash save Ray from pieces of a falling building, he realizes the League aren't criminals and stops the fight. The Justice Guild were comic book characters on the Justice League's Earth about whom Green Lantern read as a child. He claims without the comics, he may not have his ring today, as the comics taught him what it means to be a hero. J'onn J'onzz hypothesizes that the JGA writers had a subconscious link to their Earth during flashes of "inspiration" which were actually psychic memories of the Justice Guild's exploits; this is a nod to the explanation Gardner Fox provided for the JSA/JLA link in his September 1961 story Flash of Two Worlds in which the Barry Allen Flash of Earth-One encounters Jay Garrick, his Earth-Two counterpart. They help the JGA fight a group of their enemies called the Injustice Guild of America, who are based on Golden Age DC supervillains, which consists of Music Master, Sportsman, Sir Swami, and Doctor Blizzard after they were given a letter by Sergeant O'Shaughnessey and his unnamed partner. The IGA engage in a scheme to pull off a series of crimes based on the four elements of earth, air, water, and fire as part of a contest to see which of them can pull off the best crime related to those elements, and by doing so will lead the IGA in their next criminal activity. Doctor Blizzard wins when he takes Flash and Black Siren as hostages, and he leads the IGA in robbing the Seaboard City Mint and escaping by blimp. The IGA are defeated by the JL and the JGA and are handed over to the police.

Meanwhile, Hawkgirl discovers graves of the JGA covered in vines, prompting her and Lantern to probe deeper into inconsistencies found in the "perfect" Seaboard City, such as how some, if not all dangers in it happen to come from out of nowhere. The two question the driver of the ice cream truck, constantly driving around, about their suspicions, but he only responds to their questions with unspecific answers including about the last time he ever actually sold any ice cream. He can only say that "he" might hear them before driving away. They go to a library, where they discover that all the books on the shelves have blank pages, and going to the basement, they find a brick wall behind the basement door. After Hawkgirl smashes through it, they find a battle-scarred subway tunnel, and an old newspaper (dated to the same day as the final Justice Guild comic book). The newspaper's headlines reveal that the JGA world's version of the Cuban Missile Crisis had escalated into World War III, killing the Justice Guild and destroying Seaboard City with a nuclear holocaust. The deaths of the Justice Guild on their Earth resulted in the Justice Guild comic book being cancelled on the Justice League's Earth.

Hawkgirl and Lantern show this knowledge to Flash, J'onn and the JGA; shocked, the JGA deny that their existence is nothing more than an illusion. J'onn suspects Ray Thompson is the key to the bizarre state of this reality. Ray denies knowing anything, but J'onn makes a telepathic link with him, causing him to reveal his true form: a disfigured mutant with the ability to warp reality and create psychic illusions. Ray's abilities were activated by the nuclear radiation, and he created the false time warp the city is in as a consequence of their manifestation. With a distorted and nostalgic view of the past, he recreated the world of his childhood and resurrected the heroes he worshiped as a child. Angrily, Ray goes on a rampage and tries to kill the JL, while distracting the JGA with a giant red robot. The Guild heroes are initially unsure of what they should do, realizing the only chance they have of saving the JL and stopping Ray is by defeating him, which will undo the illusion and everything within it, including themselves. They eventually decide they can forfeit their false lives to do this, reasoning that inasmuch as they had sacrifice themselves to save their world once, they can do so again. They all attack Ray, overwhelming his mind and shattering the illusion. Lantern then watches in dismay as the JGA fade away into oblivion with smiles on their faces while Streak salutes him.

The Mayor of Seaboard City, Sergeant O'Shaughnessy, his partner, the ice cream man, and all of the other civilians are freed from the illusion. The ice cream man stated that war destroyed their world and now they have the opportunity to begin to rebuild their shattered world starting with Seaboard City as the civilians thank the League for giving them a future. The Justice League members return to their own Earth using a space-time machine Tom Turbine was working on before his death, powered by Green Lantern's ring.

Back on his own Earth, John Stewart ponders of how much the JGA comics meant to him when he was young and the impact the comics' cancellation in 1962 (the year the actual Guild died) had on him. He remarks to Hawkgirl that the JGA taught him the meaning of the word hero, a commentary on the bright, optimistic Golden and Silver Age's contrast to the Bronze and Modern Age's grittiness and angst.

Members
Among the members of the Justice Guild are:

 Streak (voiced by David Naughton) — The leader of the Guild who possesses super-speed and wears a football helmet.
 Cat Man (voiced by Stephen Root) — A cat-themed member of the Guild who is a master martial artist. He additionally has a Cat-Cycle and sidecar, and possesses a grappling hook and gauntlets with retractable claws.
 Green Guardsman (voiced by William Katt) — He wields a power ring which can create a variety of hard-light constructs. His ring is ineffective against anything associated with aluminium.
 Tom Turbine (voiced by Ted McGinley) — The team's brains, he is a genius intellect specializing in nuclear physics and meta-physics. Tom also has a mesomorphic build, making him naturally very strong as well. He possesses a belt containing an advanced flat, circular push-button-activated turbine and thick ring-like metal wristlets and anklets. When the turbine that powers the wristlets and anklets is turned on, it grants him flight and super-strength. It presumably also imbues him with great speed and agility, but not as fast as The Streak or as agile as Cat Man.
 Black Siren (voiced by Jennifer Hale) — The only female member of the Justice Guild, while on a team of all males, she takes it upon herself to handle the household chores and duties. She is often paired with Cat Man on missions and it is implied that they are also romantically engaged.
 Ray Thompson (voiced by Neil Patrick Harris) — The team's mascot. After the Justice Guild died during a nuclear war that destroyed his own world, Ray survived and became exposed to the radioactive fallout that mutated his DNA, giving him the psychic ability to mold the world to one of his own choosing. Using his new powers, Ray chose to recreate what he had lost along with the heroes he grew fond of as a child. When the Justice Guild found out their existence was a fake, they fought back and overcame Ray's powers, undoing the illusion and everything in it.

Injustice Guild 
A group of super-villains whose goal is to eliminate the Justice Guild and rule the world. They make their headquarters in a cave somewhere outside of Seaboard City. Among its members are:

 Sir Swami (voiced by Jeffrey Jones) — The leader of the Injustice Guild. He is a turban-wearing magician with limitless powers that comes from his magic wand. Swami proposed a contest to see who can pull off the perfect crime related to the four elements of nature. He tried to steal a jewel related to fire (Streak identified it as the "Flame of Rasputin") but was stopped by Green Lantern and Streak. He escaped through a phone booth. He later assisted Dr. Blizzard in his scheme which also ended in failure. It is unknown if he is a projection of Ray's mind or a real person or if he survived the nuclear war.
 Music Master (voiced by Udo Kier) — A member of the Injustice Guild. He possesses an accordion that emits high intensity sound waves. He was the first member of the Injustice Guild to encounter the Justice League. He tried to steal a priceless instrument, but was thwarted by the League. He escaped and told the rest of the Injustice Guild about the new heroes. When Sir Swami proposed a contest to see who could pull off a crime related to the four elements, Music Master chose air and stole a replica of the Wright Brothers' glider plane. Hawkgirl and Green Guardsman gave chase but couldn't damage the plane. Music Master got away with the plane but lost the contest to Dr. Blizzard. He was eventually defeated by both The Justice League and Guild. It is unknown if he survived the war or if he's a projection of Ray's mind.
 Sportsman (voiced by Michael McKean) — A member of the Injustice Guild who uses sports equipment to commit crimes. His mannerisms mirror those of Bob Hope. When Sir Swami proposed a contest to see who could pull off a crime related to the four elements, Sportsman chose earth and stole a tennis trophy. He escapes capture by J'onn Jonnz, Cat Man, and Ray Thompson. He is eventually defeated by both the Justice League and Guild. It is unknown if he survived the war or if he's a projection of Ray's mind.
 Doctor Blizzard (voiced by Corey Burton) — A member of the Injustice Guild. He possesses a special doctor's light-reflector that gives him ice ray powers and also makes cheesy ice puns. When Sir Swami proposed a contest to see who could pull off a crime related to the four elements, Doctor Blizzard chose water and planned to steal a new fountain during its dedication by the Mayor of Seaboard City. Flash and Black Siren intervened, but Doctor Blizzard froze them and took them to his hideout where he won the contest. Since he won, he got to pick their next move. He chose to rob the Seaboard City mint, then escape by blimp with help from his teammates. Cat Man single-handedly took down the entire Injustice Guild and foiled their plot. It is unknown if he survived the war or if he's a projection of Ray's mind.
 Ray Thompson — He has a young boy form and later he is an evil mutant in his real form.

Homages
 Bruce Timm has commented that Ray Thompson is based on both Roy Thomas, who collaborated on the animated series, due to his famous admiration of the Golden Age comics, and science-fiction writer Ray Bradbury, because many of Bradbury's stories deal with nostalgia compared to the harshness of the present.
 The idea of Ray's special ability is based on Marvel Comics' Rick Jones summoning the Golden Age heroes in the Avengers' Kree-Skrull War, a story written by Roy Thomas.
 The Justice League staff originally intended to use the Golden Age Justice Society of America, but access to the characters was denied by DC Comics as Paul Levitz felt the story as written disrespected the JSA and the characters' portrayals clashed with the post-Crisis JSA's portrayal in current comics. However, Levitz agreed to a compromise: the producers could change the names and designs just enough to make the team not quite the JSA, but still get the point across.
 Members of the Justice Guild were intended to reflect:
 The Streak resembles the Golden Age Flash. His role as leader of the Justice Guild mirrors the Flash's role as the first chairman of the Justice Society. 
 Tom Turbine is an homage to the Golden Age Atom, possessing his short stature, overall color scheme, similar belt, and also their profession, with the Atom being a genius physics professor at Calvin College and Tom Turbine being a physicist himself. Tom Turbine's energetically charged punches pay homage to The Atom's own Atomic Punch, a power he acquired later into his career. The alliteration of Tom Turbine's name is also an homage to 'Atom Al', the nickname used to bully Al Pratt for his stature and which inspired his Atom moniker. Turbine also shares some of the Golden Age Superman's facial features.
 Green Guardsman resembles the Golden Age Green Lantern, with his ring not working on anything associated with aluminum is an homage to Alan Scott's ring not working on anything associated with wood. His alter ego is given as Scott Mason.  
 Catman is a combination of Wildcat and Golden Age Batman with the personality of Adam West's version of Batman from the 1960s live-action TV series. He is not to be confused with the Batman villain of the same name, whose alter ego was Thomas Blake. However, the real name of the Justice Guild of America's Catman is T. Blake which is an homage to the Batman villain.
 Black Siren resembles the Golden Age Black Canary. The name given on her tombstone, Donna Vance, is similar to that of the original Black Canary Dinah Drake Lance. 
 JGA enemies the Injustice Guild were modified versions of the Injustice Society:
 The Music Master is an homage to the Fiddler.
 The Sportsman is an homage to the Sportsmaster.
 Dr. Blizzard is an homage to the original Icicle.
 Sir Swami is an homage to the Wizard.
 The episode ends with "Respectfully dedicated to the memory of Gardner F. Fox." Gardner Fox was a prominent writer of both the Golden and Silver Age era and co-created both the JSA and JLA. Fox was also the creator of the concept of the DC Multiverse, and author of the first comic to feature the Multiverse, Flash #123, "The Flash of Two Worlds". This is among the DCAU episodes that pay homage to those writers, another being Superman: The Animated Series episode "Apokolips... Now!" which was dedicated to Jack Kirby.

In other media

Arrowverse
Elements of this concept are seen within the Arrowverse:

 Barry Allen (Grant Gustin) was initially coined "The Streak" by Iris West in The Flash early in season one before officially being given The Flash codename.
 The Earth-Two metahuman version of Dinah Laurel Lance (Katie Cassidy) uses the "Black Siren" alias in The Flash and Arrow.

References

External links
 The Justice Guild Of America
 Legends - Episode Info
 Earth 2.5 timeline
 Justice Guild of America at DCAU Wiki

Television characters introduced in 2001
Golden Age superheroes
Characters created by Bruce Timm
DC Animated Universe original characters
Fictional characters from parallel universes
Justice League in other media
DC Comics superhero teams
Fictional guilds